Interlandi is a surname. Notable people with the surname include:

Frank Interlandi (1924–2010), American editorial cartoonist
Jeneen Interlandi (born 1977), American journalist
Telesio Interlandi (1894–1965), Italian journalist and propagandist